Damian O'Hare (born 13 August 1977) is an Irish actor. He is best known for his role as Lieutenant Gillette in Pirates of the Caribbean: The Curse of the Black Pearl and Pirates of the Caribbean: On Stranger Tides.

Filmography

Film

Theatre
 Double Feature (National Theatre Paintframe, London, 2011)
 The Grapes of Wrath (Chichester Festival Theatre & English Touring Theatre, 2009)
 The Revenger's Tragedy (Manchester Royal Exchange Theatre, 2008)
 Salt Meets Wound (Theatre 503, London 2007)
 A Whistle in the Dark (Manchester Royal Exchange & Tricycle Theatre, London 2006)
 The Countess (Criterion Theatre, London 2005)
 Ghosts (Connal Morrison Lyric Theatre, Belfast)
 Small Change (Crucible Theatre, Sheffield 2002)
 The Magic Toyshop (Shared Experience 2002)

Television

Video games

References

External links

Livejournal Community
Agent's Website
Review of Whistle in the Dark
Review of The Countess
Review of Small Change
Review of The Magic Toyshop
Damian O'Hare - Unofficial Website

1977 births
Living people
Male film actors from Northern Ireland
Male actors from Belfast
Male television actors from Northern Ireland
Male stage actors from Northern Ireland
Male video game actors from Northern Ireland
Male voice actors from Northern Ireland
21st-century male actors from Northern Ireland